Tritonoturris menecharmes is a species of sea snail, a marine gastropod mollusk in the family Raphitomidae.

Subspecies
 Tritonoturris menecharmes albescens Melvill, 1923

Description
The length of the shell varies between 8 mm and 30 mm.

(Original description) The delicate, turreted shell has an pale ochreous-brown color, or is (var. albescens) pure white. The shell contains 8-9 whorls. The protoconch itself is globular, plain, the next beautifully but microscopically cancellate, the remainder longitudinally acutely costate, angled above. They are crossed by, in full-grown specimens, on the upper whorls, two, on the body whorl four, spiral raised ribs. The interstitial spacesare quadrate, smooth and acutely echinate at the points of junction. The number of the ribs on the body whorl is eleven to twelve. The aperture is oblong. The outer lip is incrassate, without 5-echinate, within obscurely denticulate. The sinus is fairly broad and conspicuous. The, columellar margin is straight and multiplicate. The siphonal canal is abbreviate and slightly recurved.

Distribution
This marine species occurs off Mauritius, Taiwan and the Philippines.

References

 Drivas, J.; Jay, M. (1987). Coquillages de La Réunion et de l'Île Maurice. Collection Les Beautés de la Nature. Delachaux et Niestlé: Neuchâtel. . 159 pp.
 Liu, J.Y. [Ruiyu] (ed.). (2008). Checklist of marine biota of China seas. China Science Press. 1267 pp.

External links
  Powell A.W.B.(1966) The molluscan families Speightiidae and Turridae: an evaluation of the valid taxa, both recent and fossil, with lists of characteristic species; Bulletin of the Auckland Institute and Museum ; no. 5
  Tucker, J.K. 2004 Catalog of recent and fossil turrids (Mollusca: Gastropoda). Zootaxa 682:1–1295
 Gastropods.com: Tritonoturris menecharmes

menecharmes
Gastropods described in 1923